Delve Special was a UK BBC Radio 4 comedy starring Stephen Fry as investigative reporter David Lander.  It ran for four series from 1984 to 1987, each series being four 30-minute episodes long.  It was written by Tony Sarchet and produced by Paul Mayhew-Archer.  The first series was wiped by the BBC but has since been found and consisted of a four-part investigation into the proposed building of London's third airport in "Shifton", a small village situated 'just to the north east of Birmingham', and the alleged bribery and corruption that accompanied the choice of location and building contractor.

David Lander's investigative technique was usually somewhere between the questionable and the illegal - during each episode he also displayed some degree of ineptitude or lack of understanding in the subject matter he was reporting on.  As a result, he occasionally found himself being set upon physically by those concerned.  The programme heavily spoofed the style of topical radio reporters such as John Waite of Face the Facts and Roger Cook, a Radio 4 presenter who went on to television work such as The Cook Report.

Actors appearing in Delve Special included: Tony Robinson, Felicity Montagu, Stephen Frost, Mark Arden, Jack Klaff, Harry Enfield, Dawn French, Brenda Blethyn, Arthur Smith, Janine Duvitski, Philip Pope and Robert Bathurst Andrew Sachs.

The theme music to the programme was Crunch by Soft Machine.

A follow-up television version ran for two series: This is David Lander (starring Stephen Fry) in 1988, and This is David Harper (starring Tony Slattery) in 1990 - Fry being unavailable for the second series due to other commitments.

Episodes

Series 1

Series 2

Series 3

Series 4

External links
 Delve Special on BBC Sounds

BBC Radio comedy programmes
Radio programs adapted into television shows
1984 radio programme debuts
1987 radio programme endings